Nijat may refer to
Nijat (given name)
Nijat Abasov,  Azerbaijani chess grandmaster
Nijat Mamedov, Azerbaijani chess grandmaster
Nijat Kabul F.C., an association football club based in Kabul, Afghanistan
Nijat Sirel, Turkish sculptor
Operation Rah-e-Nijat, a 2009 military operation in Pakistan